is a railway station located in the city of Daisen, Akita Prefecture, Japan, operated by JR East.

Lines
Ugo-Nagoya Station is served by the Tazawako Line, and is located 64.6 km from the terminus of the line at Morioka Station.

Station layout
The station has two opposed side platforms connected by a footbridge. The station is staffed.

Platforms

History
Ugo-Nagano Station opened on July 30, 1921 as a station on the Obonai keiben-sen, began operations from July 30, 1921, and was nationalized the following year, becoming part of the Japanese Government Railways (JGR), the pre-war predecessor to the Japan National Railways (JNR), serving the village of Nakano, Akita. The station was absorbed into the JR East network upon the privatization of the JNR on April 1, 1987. A new station building was completed in March 2009.

Passenger statistics
In fiscal 2018, the station was used by an average of 92 passengers daily (boarding passengers only).

Surrounding area
 
former Nakasen Town Hall

See also
 List of Railway Stations in Japan

References

External links

 JR East Station information 

Railway stations in Japan opened in 1921
Railway stations in Akita Prefecture
Tazawako Line
Daisen, Akita